Megacraspedus subdolellus is a moth of the family Gelechiidae. It was described by Staudinger in 1859. It is found in Portugal, Spain and France.

The forewings are dirty straw-yellow, with a white margin especially towards the tip. There are whitish-pearl longitudinal stripes in the middle.

References

Moths described in 1859
Megacraspedus